Reticulitermes lucifugus is classified as a species of termite in the genus Reticulitermes. Its diet consists mainly of  rotten timber and logs. This genus unusually lacks a queen termite. It is found in the Provence region and the Broadleaf Woodlands of North America.

References 

Termites